Democratic World Federalists, a civil society organization based in San Francisco with supporters worldwide, advocates a democratic federal system of world government in order to end war and crimes against humanity and to promote “a just world community and the preservation of a livable and healthful global environment” through the development of enforceable world law. It is affiliated with the Coalition for Democratic World Government, the Community of World Citizens, and the World Federalist Movement.

Antecedents of a democratic, federal system of world government 
Although the organization was incorporated as an independent public-benefit educational organization in California on 28 January 2004, it traces its origins to further back in history.

During the 1930s and 1940s numerous attempts were made locally, nationally, and regionally by activists to prevent the outbreak and spread of war and to mobilize initiatives and forces favoring a World Federation. In 1938—1939 Federal Union was launched in the United Kingdom and the U.S.A.

In April 1942 high-school student Harris Wofford Jr., formed the Student Federalists. It rapidly grew into a national organization with thousands of members from secondary and university students, later including young veterans returning from World War-II. (Several were among the founders of Democratic World Federalists sixty years later.)

In 1945-46 a Hungarian news agency head, Emery Reves, published the seminal The Anatomy of Peace, which declared that sovereignty lay with the citizens, who could delegate powers to governments at all levels, including the global level.  This turned on thousands to the idea of a world federation.

In February 1947 a number of world federalist and world government representatives met in Asheville, North Carolina, and formed the United World Federalists.

In 1946-47 representatives of early world federalist groups met first in Luxembourg, then in Montreux, Switzerland, formed the World Movement for World Federal Government, and issued the Montreux Declaration, which declared the need for world federal government if wars were ever to be ended.

Activism by Northern California World Federalists and Democratic World Federalists 

In 1949, a team including the President of the United World Federalists of California Alan Cranston and its Executive Director Robert Walker convinced the State Legislature to pass the California Resolution, the first of several post-war state resolutions calling for the United States to participate in a world constitutional convention.

In 1965, during the 20th anniversary of the drafting of the U.N. Charter in San Francisco, the World Congress of the World Association of World Federalists (successor to W.M.W.F.G.) was held in San Francisco.

In 1983 the World Federalist Association was organized from the chapters and members of the old United World Federalists, and the Northern California region became active again with a staffed office first in Oakland, then in San Francisco.

In 1989 and throughout the 1990s activists in Northern California supported Philadelphia-II and its sister organization, One World, a movement for direct democracy leading to a world constitutional convention through the citizens’ initiative.

Since 1992 D.W.F. has published the quarterly Toward Democratic World Federation, which provides articles from leading world federalist scholars, activist citizens and like-minded organizations on World Government and related current topics.  (To access T.D.W.F. articles in D.W.F.’s e-archives click here.)

In 1993 when the World Federalist Association was promoting United Nations Reform, its Northern California branch played a major role in organizing a hearing in San Francisco of Congressman Jim Leach’s U.S. Commission on Improving the Effectiveness of the United Nations. This took place in the Green Room of the War Memorial Building, where the Charter of the U.N. had been negotiated in 1945.

In 1995 W.F.A.’s Northern California branch hosted the XXIInd World Congress of the World Federalist Movement (successor to WAWF), and organized an all-day forum on “Restructuring the United Nations: Achieving Democratic Global Governance for the 21st Century” with speakers from fourteen countries.

During the 1990s a committee of W.F.M. Councillors from 11 countries on four continents headed by one from Northern California produced a pamphlet of democratic world federalist principles, which D.W.F. published as Federalism and the Right of People to Self-Government.

In 2004-05 activists of the former W.F.A./N.Ca. incorporated as a civil society educational body (coming under Section 501(c)(3) of the I.R.S. code) and, with citizens from a dozen countries active in its office and/or governance, it took the name Democratic World Federalists, as it attracted supporters of world federation from throughout the United States and on five continents.

In 2005 D.W.F. helped promote the launching of One World Democracy, written by two of its supporters.

Today, over sixty years after its foundation, D.W.F. promotes a democratic world federation and addresses contemporary global problems by e-mail, a quarterly publication, and outreach to media, politicians, educational institutions and libraries, and other civil society organizations.

Principles and objectives 

The stated goal of D.W.F. is to end war and maintain peace, guarantee human rights, promote a just world community, and cope with environmental degradation and the squandering of natural resources. The D.W.F. argues this can best be achieved through establishing a democratic federal world government.  (For D.W.F.’s purposes and objectives, click here.)

Rather than using force to solve international conflicts, political and judicial structures and procedures would be used. Although democratically elected national governments would still be in charge of domestic affairs at the country level, world courts with enforceable judgments would be able to try perpetrators of international and world-level crimes.

Since its beginning, D.W.F. has been promoting a better understanding of good government at all levels, up to the global level in the form of a democratic world federation.

See also
 New world order (Baháʼí)

References

Further reading
 See Democratic World Federalists website, http://www.dwfed.org/.
 Emery Reves, The Anatomy Peace (New York and London: Harper & Brothers Publishers, 1945–46)
 Barbara M. Walker, On the Bicentennial of the United States Constitution (Washington DC: World Federalist Association, 1987/1991)
 Ronald J. Glossop, World Federation? A Critical Analysis of Federal World Government (Jefferson, NC: McFarland & Company, 1993)
 Barbara M. Walker, Uniting the Peoples and Nations; Readings in World Federalism (1993)
 Gilbert Jonas, One Shining Moment: A Short History of the American Student World Federalist Movement 1942-1953 (Lincoln, NE: iUniverse.com, 2001)
 Joseph P. Baratta, The Politics of World Federation (Westport, CT: Praeger, 2004).
 Jerry Tetalman and Byron Belitos, One World Democracy; A Progressive Vision for Enforceable Global Law (San Rafael, CA: Origin Press, 2005)

World federalist movement member organizations
Global policy organizations
Globalism
World government
International law organizations
Organizations established in 2004
2004 establishments in California
Organizations based in San Francisco